The 2023 Oregon State Beavers baseball team represents Oregon State University in the 2023 NCAA Division I baseball season. The Beavers play their home games at Goss Stadium at Coleman Field as members of the Pac-12 Conference. The team is led by Pat Casey Head Baseball Coach Mitch Canham in his fourth season at Oregon State.

Preseason
The Beavers were ranked in the preseason Top-25 by only three of the six major poll organizations and were picked to finish third in the Pac-12 preseason coaches poll despite ending the prior season ranked 10th in the final D1 poll. The team lost 18 players from the 2022 squad, including Major League Baseball 1st round pick and National Pitcher of the Year Award winner Cooper Hjerpe, but signed one of the top recruiting classes in the nation.

Regular season
Following a three-game sweep of Coppin State, Trent Sellers was named the Pac-12's Pitcher of the Week and Gavin Turley was selected as conference Player of the Week. 

Mitch Canham reached his 100th win as head coach on March 7th in a win over San Diego, becoming the fifth Beaver head coach to reach that milestone.

Roster

Schedule and results

! style="" | Regular Season
|- valign="top"

|-bgcolor=ffbbbb
| Feb 17 || vs. * ||  || Surprise Stadium • Surprise, AZ || 2–7 || Egloff (1–0) || Sellers (0–1) || McBroom || 0–1 || 
|-bgcolor=bbffbb
| Feb 18 || vs. * ||  || Surprise Stadium • Surprise, AZ || 8–7 || Larson (1–0) || Klassen (0–1) || Brown (1) || 1–1 || 
|-bgcolor=bbffbb
| Feb 19 || vs. New Mexico* ||  || Surprise Stadium • Surprise, AZ || 14–6  || Hutcheson (1–0) || Russell (0–1) || None || 2–1 || 
|-bgcolor=bbffbb
| Feb 20 || vs. * ||  || Surprise Stadium • Surprise, AZ || 11–08 || Lawson (1–0) || Bremner (0–1) || None || 3–1 || 
|-bgcolor=bbffbb
| Feb 24 || vs. * ||  || Goss Stadium at Coleman Field • Corvallis, OR || 11–1 || Sellers (1–1) || McCallum (1–1) || None || 4–1 || 
|-bgcolor=bbffbb
| Feb 25 || vs. Coppin State* ||  || Goss Stadium at Coleman Field • Corvallis, OR || 16–0 || Kmatz (1–0) || Herrand (1–1) || None || 5–1 || 
|-bgcolor=bbffbb
| Feb 26 || vs. Coppin State* ||  || Goss Stadium at Coleman Field • Corvallis, OR || 19–5 || Lattery (1–0) || Hamberg (0–1) || None || 6–1 || 
|-

|-bgcolor=bbffbb
| Mar 2 || at * ||  || Robin Baggett Stadium • San Luis Obispo, CA || 5–4 || Lattery (2–0) || True (0–2) || Brown (2) || 7–1 || 
|-bgcolor=bbffbb
| Mar 3 || at Cal Poly* ||  || Robin Baggett Stadium • San Luis Obispo, CA || 7–2 || Jimenez (1–0) || Warreck (1–1) || Mejia (1) || 8–1 || 
|-bgcolor=ffbbbb
| Mar 4 || at Cal Poly* ||  || Robin Baggett Stadium • San Luis Obispo, CA || 2–4 || Weston (1–1) || Kmatz (1–1) || Scott (1) || 8–2 || 
|-bgcolor=bbffbb
| Mar 4 || at Cal Poly* ||  || Robin Baggett Stadium • San Luis Obispo, CA || 3–1 || Hunter (1–0) || Baum (1–2) || Brown (3) || 9–2 || 
|-bgcolor=bbffbb
| Mar 7 || vs. * || No. 25 || Goss Stadium at Coleman Field • Corvallis, OR || 9–4 || Thorsteinson (1–0) || Negrete (1–1) || None || 10–2 || 
|-bgcolor=bbffbb
| Mar 10 || vs.  || No. 25 || Goss Stadium at Coleman Field • Corvallis, OR || 5–1 || Sellers (2–1) || Hawkins (1–2) || None || 11–2 || 1–0
|-bgcolor=ffbbbb
| Mar 11 || vs. Washington State || No. 25 || Goss Stadium at Coleman Field • Corvallis, OR || 3–6 || Kaelber (3–0) || Kmatz (1–2) || Grillo (4) || 11–3 || 1–1
|-bgcolor=ffbbbb
| Mar 12 || vs. Washington State || No. 25 || Goss Stadium at Coleman Field • Corvallis, OR || 1–3 || Wilford (2–0) || Hunter (1–1) || Grillo (5) || 11–4 || 1–2
|-bgcolor=ffbbbb
| Mar 14 || vs. * ||  || Goss Stadium at Coleman Field • Corvallis, OR || 1–5 || Stumbo (2–1) || Larson (1–1) || None || 11–5 || 1–2
|-bgcolor=bbffbb
| Mar 15 || vs. Nevada* ||  || Goss Stadium at Coleman Field • Corvallis, OR || 12–1 || Grewe (1–0) || Biesterfeld (0–2) || None || 12–5 || 1–2
|-bgcolor=ffbbbb
| Mar 17 || at No. 9 Stanford ||  || Klein Field at Sunken Diamond • Stanford, CA || 8–9 || Dowd (1–1) || Sellers (2–2) || Bruno (2) || 12–6 || 1–3
|-bgcolor=ffbbbb
| Mar 18 || at No. 9 Stanford ||  || Klein Field at Sunken Diamond • Stanford, CA || 5–8 || Scott (3–0) || Kmatz (1–3) || None || 12–7 || 1–4
|-bgcolor=bbbbbb
| Mar 19 || at No. 9 Stanford ||  || Klein Field at Sunken Diamond • Stanford, CA ||   ||  ||  ||  ||  || 
|-bgcolor=bbbbbb
| Mar 21 || vs. * ||  || Goss Stadium at Coleman Field • Corvallis, OR ||  ||  ||  ||  ||  || 
|-bgcolor=bbbbbb
| Mar 24 || vs.  ||  || Goss Stadium at Coleman Field • Corvallis, OR ||  ||  ||  ||  ||  || 
|-bgcolor=bbbbbb
| Mar 25 || vs. California ||  || Goss Stadium at Coleman Field • Corvallis, OR ||  ||  ||  ||  ||  || 
|-bgcolor=bbbbbb
| Mar 26 || vs. California ||  || Goss Stadium at Coleman Field • Corvallis, OR ||  ||  ||  ||  ||  || 
|-bgcolor=bbbbbb
| Mar 29 || at * ||  || Bannerwood Park • Bellevue, WA ||   ||  ||  ||  ||  || 
|-bgcolor=bbbbbb
| Mar 31 || at  ||  || Husky Ballpark • Seattle, WA ||  ||  ||  ||  ||  || 
|-

|-bgcolor=bbbbbb
| Apr 1 || at Washington ||  || Husky Ballpark • Seattle, WA ||  ||  ||  ||  ||  || 
|-bgcolor=bbbbbb
| Apr 2 || at Washington ||  || Husky Ballpark • Seattle, WA ||   ||  ||  ||  ||  || 
|-bgcolor=bbbbbb
| Apr 5 || at  ||  || PK Park • Eugene, OR ||  ||  ||  ||  ||  || 
|-bgcolor=bbbbbb
| Apr 8 || at Oregon || || PK Park • Eugene, OR ||  ||  ||  ||  ||  || 
|-bgcolor=bbbbbb
| Apr 9 || at Oregon ||  || PK Park • Eugene, OR ||  ||  ||  ||  ||  || 
|-bgcolor=bbbbbb
| Apr 10 || vs. * ||  || Goss Stadium at Coleman Field • Corvallis, OR ||   ||  ||  ||  ||  || 
|-bgcolor=bbbbbb
| Apr 11 || vs. Gonzaga* ||  || Goss Stadium at Coleman Field • Corvallis, OR ||   ||  ||  ||  ||  || 
|-bgcolor=bbbbbb
| Apr 14 || vs.  ||  || Goss Stadium at Coleman Field • Corvallis, OR ||   ||  ||  ||  ||  || 
|-bgcolor=bbbbbb
| Apr 15 || vs. USC ||  || Goss Stadium at Coleman Field • Corvallis, OR ||   ||  ||  ||  ||  || 
|-bgcolor=bbbbbb
| Apr 16 || vs. USC ||  || Goss Stadium at Coleman Field • Corvallis, OR ||  ||  ||  ||  ||  || 
|-bgcolor=bbbbbb
| Apr 18 || vs. Seattle* ||  || Goss Stadium at Coleman Field • Corvallis, OR ||  ||  ||  ||  ||  || 
|-bgcolor=bbbbbb
| Apr 21 || at  ||  || Phoenix Municipal Stadium • Phoenix, AZ ||  ||  ||  ||  ||  || 
|-bgcolor=bbbbbb
| Apr 22 || at Arizona State ||  || Phoenix Municipal Stadium • Phoenix, AZ ||  ||  ||  ||  ||  || 
|-bgcolor=bbbbbb
| Apr 23 || at Arizona State ||  || Phoenix Municipal Stadium • Phoenix, AZ ||  ||  ||  ||  ||  || 
|-bgcolor=bbbbbb
| Apr 24 || at * ||  || Brazell Field at GCU Ballpark • Phoenix, AZ ||  ||  ||  ||  ||  || 
|-bgcolor=bbbbbb
| Apr 28 || vs. Arizona ||  || Goss Stadium at Coleman Field • Corvallis, OR ||  ||  ||  ||  ||  || 
|-bgcolor=bbbbbb
| Apr 29 || vs. Arizona ||  || Goss Stadium at Coleman Field • Corvallis, OR ||  ||  ||  ||  ||  || 
|-bgcolor=bbbbbb
| Apr 30 || vs. Arizona ||  || Goss Stadium at Coleman Field • Corvallis, OR ||  ||  ||  ||  ||  || 
|-

|-bgcolor=bbbbbb
| May 2 || vs. Oregon* ||  || Goss Stadium at Coleman Field • Corvallis, OR ||  ||  ||  ||  ||  || 
|-bgcolor=bbbbbb
| May 5 || vs.  ||  || Goss Stadium at Coleman Field • Corvallis, OR ||  ||  ||  ||  ||  || 
|-bgcolor=bbbbbb
| May 6 || vs. Utah ||  || Goss Stadium at Coleman Field • Corvallis, OR ||  ||  ||  ||  ||  || 
|-bgcolor=bbbbbb
| May 7 || vs. Utah ||  || Goss Stadium at Coleman Field • Corvallis, OR ||  ||  ||  ||  ||  || 
|-bgcolor=bbbbbb
| May 9 || at Portland* ||  || Ron Tonkin Field • Hillsboro, OR ||  ||  ||  ||  ||  || 
|-bgcolor=bbbbbb
| May 12 || at UCLA ||  || Jackie Robinson Stadium • Los Angeles, CA ||   ||  ||  ||  ||  || 
|-bgcolor=bbbbbb
| May 13 || at UCLA ||  || Jackie Robinson Stadium • Los Angeles, CA ||  ||  ||  ||  ||  || 
|-bgcolor=bbbbbb
| May 14 || at UCLA ||  || Jackie Robinson Stadium • Los Angeles, CA ||  ||  ||  ||  ||  || 
|-bgcolor=bbbbbb
| May 16 || vs. Portland* ||  || Goss Stadium at Coleman Field • Corvallis, OR ||  ||  ||  ||  ||  || 
|-bgcolor=bbbbbb
| May 18 || vs. * ||  || Goss Stadium at Coleman Field • Corvallis, OR ||  ||  ||  ||  ||  || 
|-bgcolor=bbbbbb
| May 19 || vs. Western Carolina ||  || Goss Stadium at Coleman Field • Corvallis, OR ||  ||  ||  ||  ||  || 
|-bgcolor=bbbbbb
| May 20 || vs. Western Carolina ||  || Goss Stadium at Coleman Field • Corvallis, OR ||  ||  ||  ||  ||  || 
|-

|-
|- style="text-align:center;"
|

Rankings

References

Oregon State Beavers baseball seasons
Oregon State
2023 in sports in Oregon